Coleophora machinopis is a moth of the family Coleophoridae. It is found in Iraq, Turkestan, Uzbekistan and Turkey.

The larvae feed on Alhagi sparsifolia and possibly other Alhagi species. They live inside the inside stem of their host plant and do not make a case. The larvae are yellow with a chocolate-brown head and a length of around 12 mm. They bore through the pith of the branches of their host plant up to root collar, making a passage of brownish powder. In autumn, the bore is curved and covered in silk. There is a free passage toward the surface of the stem, the outer opening of which is covered with a three-sided valve. Larvae can be found from May to October. Full-fed larvae hibernate in the lower part of the stem in light silky cocoon. Pupation and emergence of adults takes place in early spring, although it might occur as early as midwinter in warm weather.

References

machinopis
Moths described in 1936
Moths of Asia